Posina is a town in the province of Vicenza, Veneto, Italy. It is northeast of SS46. As of 2007 Posina had an estimated population of 657.
On the whole dominates the Pasubio which can be accessed through the picturesque Val Caprara, Val Sorapache or arrived at passo Xomo  on the Strada degli Scarubbi or the famous Strada delle 52 gallerie great work of military engineering the First World War.

The most important historical building in the town is the Church of Saint Margaret, consecrated in 1764 and restored in 2008. Posina is also home to the EcoMuseo Grande Guerra which remembers the battles of the First World War that had a profound effect on Posina and the surrounding area.

Points of interest
 Strada delle 52 gallerie

Sources
(Google Maps)

Cities and towns in Veneto